General elections were held in Sweden on 16 September 1973. The Social Democrats remained the largest party, winning 156 of the 350 seats.

For most of the campaign, the opposition parties had led the socialist parties in the polls. It has been speculated that several events influenced the outcome of the election in favour of the government: the death of King Gustaf VI Adolf the previous day, the Norrmalmstorg robbery and the 1973 Chilean coup d'état. Palme had delivered an impassioned speech on Salvador Allende's legacy on the eve of the election, in which he praised the democratic system.

The elections instead produced a draw, with the socialist and liberal-conservative blocs each winning 175 seats. Since the opposition could not pass a motion of no confidence against Palme's government, he was able to remain in power. In order to pass legislation the Social Democrats had to draw lots or seek support from the opposition. To prevent this scenario from reoccurring, the number of seats in the Riksdag was adjusted to an odd number for subsequent elections. In the popular vote, while winning an equal number of seats the socialist bloc won 2,522,656 votes to the 2,518,858 for the liberal-conservative bloc, a net difference of 3,798 votes or 48.80% versus 48.73%, although the seats ended up being shared equally because of the narrow margin.

Results

Seat distribution

By municipality

References

General elections in Sweden
Sweden
General
Sweden